Silly People may refer to:

Silly People (Desperate Housewives)
"Silly People", 1968 single by The Litter
"Silly People", Stephen Sondheim song from A Little Night Music
"Silly People", song by the Muffs from Alert Today, Alive Tomorrow